The Church and Monastery of São Vicente de Fora, meaning "Monastery of St. Vincent Outside the Walls", is a 17th-century church and monastery in the city of Lisbon, Portugal. It is one of the most important monasteries and mannerist buildings in the country. The monastery also contains the royal pantheon of the Braganza monarchs of Portugal.

History and art

The original Monastery of São Vicente de Fora was founded around 1147 by the first Portuguese King, Afonso Henriques, for the Augustinian Order. Built in Romanesque style outside the city walls, it was one of the most important monastic foundations in mediaeval Portugal. It is dedicated to Saint Vincent of Saragossa, patron saint of Lisbon, whose relics were brought from the Algarve to Lisbon in the 12th century.

The present buildings are the result of a reconstruction ordered by King Philip II of Spain, who had become King of Portugal (as Philip I) after a succession crisis in 1580. The church of the monastery was built between 1582 and 1629, while other monastery buildings were finished only in the 18th century. The author of the design of the church is thought to be the Italian Jesuit Filippo Terzi and/or the Spaniard Juan de Herrera. The plans were followed and modified by Leonardo Turriano, Baltazar Álvares, Pedro Nunes Tinoco and João Nunes Tinoco.

The church of the Monastery has a majestic, austere façade that follows the later Renaissance style known as Mannerism. The façade, attributed to Baltazar Álvares, has several niches with statues of saints and is flanked by two towers (a model that would become widespread in Portugal). The lower part of the façade has three arches that lead to the galilee (entrance hall). The floorplan of the church reveals a Latin cross building with a one-aisled nave with lateral chapels. The church is covered by barrel vaulting and has a huge dome over the crossing. The general design of the church interior follows that of the prototypic church of The Gesù, in Rome.

The beautiful main altarpiece is a Baroque work of the 18th century by one of the best Portuguese sculptors, Joaquim Machado de Castro. It has the shape of a baldachin and is decorated with a large number of statues. The church also boasts several fine altarpieces in the lateral chapels.

The Monastery buildings are reached through a magnificent baroque portal, located beside the church façade. Inside, the entrance is decorated with blue-white, 18th century tiles that tell the history of the Monastery, including scenes of the Siege of Lisbon in 1147. The ceiling of the room has an illusionistic painting executed in 1710 by the Italian Vincenzo Baccarelli. The sacristy of the Monastery is exuberantly decorated with polychromed marble and painting. The cloisters are also notable for the 18th century tiles that recount fables of La Fontaine, among other themes.

Braganza Pantheon

In 1834, after the Dissolution of the monasteries in Portugal, the monastery was transformed into a palace for the archbishops of Lisbon. Some decades later, King Ferdinand II transformed the monks' old refectory into a pantheon for the kings of the House of Braganza. Their tombs were transferred from the main chapel to this room.

References
 Portuguese Institute for Architectural Heritage 
 General Bureau for National Buildings and Monuments (Portugal) 

Religious buildings and structures completed in 1629
Roman Catholic churches in Lisbon
Portuguese monarchy
Baroque architecture in Portugal
National monuments in Lisbon District
1629 establishments in Portugal
Burial sites of the Portuguese royal houses
Burial sites of the House of Braganza
Burial sites of the House of Wittelsbach
Burial sites of the House of Saxe-Coburg and Gotha
Burial sites of the House of Braganza-Saxe-Coburg and Gotha
Burial sites of the House of Orléans
Burial sites of the House of Bourbon
Burial sites of the House of Löwenstein-Wertheim-Rosenberg
Burial sites of the House of Beauharnais
Burial sites of the House of Hohenzollern-Sigmaringen
Mannerist architecture in Portugal
Philip II of Spain